Keddy is a surname that may refer to:
Carole Keddy (born 1937), Canadian educator and politician
Gerald Keddy (born 1953), Canadian politician
James Keddy (born 1973), Irish footballer
Paul Keddy (born 1953), Canadian ecologist

See also
Keddie (disambiguation)
Keedy (disambiguation)